Lê Công Vinh is a former professional football player who played as a forward for the Vietnam national football team from 2004 to 2016. He scored 51 goals with the national team, making him the all-time top goalscorer for Vietnam. He is also the nation's most capped player, having appeared in 83 matches. In June 2016 at the age of 30, Vinh announced he would retire at the conclusion of the 2016 AFF Championship.

International goals 

 Scores and results list Vietnam's goal tally first, score column indicates score after each Vinh goal.

International statistics

Notes

References

Le Cong Vinh
Vietnam national football team